Arcelia Ramírez (born 7 December 1967) is a Mexican actress. She has appeared in more than 50 films and television shows since 1985. She starred in the film Such Is Life, which was screened in the Un Certain Regard section at the 2000 Cannes Film Festival.

Selected filmography
 Like Water for Chocolate (1992)
 La mujer de Benjamín (1991)
 Loop (1999)
 Such Is Life (2000)
 Violet Perfume: No One Is Listening (2001)
 Zurdo (2003)
 Sexo, amor y otras perversiones (2006)
 Rock Mari (2010)
 The Reasons of the Heart (2011)
 Potosí (2013)
 Buen Día, Ramón (2013)
 Bleak Street (2015)
 Juana Inés (2016)
 Veronica (2017)
 I Carry You With Me (2020)
 La Civil (2021)

Telenovelas
 El color de la pasion (2014) Supporting Role 
 Un camino hacia el destino (2016) Supporting Role 
 Por siempre Joan Sebastian (2016) Recurring Role
 Sin rastro de ti (2016) Special Appearance 
 Hijas de la luna (2018) Supporting Role 
 Vencer el miedo (2020) Co-protagonist

References

External links

1967 births
Living people
Mexican film actresses
Actresses from Mexico City
20th-century Mexican actresses